Sinking Creek is a stream in Jessamine County, Kentucky, in the United States.

Sinking Creek was so named because it is a subterranean river for some of its length, disappearing underground before surfacing again.

See also
List of rivers of Kentucky

References

Rivers of Jessamine County, Kentucky
Rivers of Kentucky